The Party of the Christian Left was a political party in Italy founded in 1939 by Franco Rodano and Adriano Ossicini.

History
The pro-Marxist Catholics, initially, organized themselves into a group composed not only by Rodano, but also by Ossicini, Marisa Cinciari, the sisters Laura and Silvia Garroni, Romualdo Chiesa, Mario Leporatti and Tonino Tatò. In the spring of 1941, Franco Rodano, Don Paolo Pecoraro and Adriano Ossicini elaborated the "Manifesto of the Cooperative Movement", in which the need for an immediate commitment of Catholics against fascism was supported, trying to reconcile the concepts of property and freedom with those of a humanitarian socialism. After that, the group formed itself into the Synarchical Cooperative Party (Partito Cooperativista Sinarchico) and began to collaborate clandestinely and from outside with the Italian Communist Party (PCI). In 1941, the PCS became the Christian Communist Party (Partito Comunista Cristiano). 

On 9 September 1944 it became Party of the Christian Left, with the confluence of the Christian-social movement of Gabriele De Rosa but, between January and May 1945, L'Osservatore Romano reaffirmed that only the DC had the right to represent the Christians in politics.

Books
 Gerd-Rainer Horn, Emmanuel Gerard, Left Catholicism, 1943-1955: Catholics and Society in Western Europe at the Point of Liberation, Leuven University Press, 2001 
 Carlo Felice Casula, Cattolici comunisti e sinistra cristiana 1938-1945, Il Mulino, Bologna, 1976
 Francesco Malgeri, La sinistra cristiana (1937-1945), Morcelliana, Brescia 1982
 Augusto Del Noce, Il cattolico comunista, Rusconi, Milan, 1981
 Rosanna M. Giammanco, The Catholic-Communist Dialogue in Italy: 1944 to the Present, Praeger, New York, 1989
 David Kertzer, Comrades and Christians: Religion and Political Struggle in Communist Italy, Cambridge University Press, New York, 1980

References

1939 establishments in Italy
1945 disestablishments in Italy
Political parties established in 1939
Political parties disestablished in 1945
Catholicism and far-left politics
Christian political parties
Catholic political parties
Christian socialist organizations
Defunct communist parties in Italy